Sheykhabad Sheykheh (also Romanized as Sheykhābād Sheykheh; also known as Sheykhābād and Sheykheh) is a village in Mirbag-e Shomali Rural District, in the Central District of Delfan County, Lorestan Province, Iran. In the 2006 census, its population was 369, in 80 families.

References 

Towns and villages in Delfan County